The Ambassador and Permanent Representative of Australia to the World Trade Organization is an officer of the Australian Department of Foreign Affairs and Trade and the head of the Permanent Mission of the Commonwealth of Australia to the World Trade Organization (WTO) in Geneva, Switzerland. The position has the rank and status of an Ambassador Extraordinary and Plenipotentiary and continues Australia's representation to the General Agreement on Tariffs and Trade (GATT; 1948–1995), as a charter member joining the WTO to replace the GATT on 1 January 1995. The Permanent Mission to the WTO is based with the Australian Permanent Mission and Consulate-General in Geneva. Prior to 1973, the role of Australia's representative on the GATT was filled by the Permanent Representative of Australia to the United Nations Office in Geneva.

Office holders

References

External links
Australian Permanent Mission and Consulate-General, Geneva, Switzerland

 
World Trade Organization